The 2014 Tipperary Senior Football Championship began in the summer of 2014. Loughmore-Castleiney were the defending champions after winning their 12th title in 2013.

The final in front of a crowd of 1,550 between Loughmore Castleiney and Cahir which was played on 21 December in Cashel and finished in a draw with the replay fixed for 26 December.
Cian Hennessy's scored the equalising point for Loughmore in the final minute after Benny Hickey had scored from a free in the 54th minute to put Cahir in front. Cahir had led 1-6 to 2-2 at half time.

Loughmore Castleiney defeated Cahir by 0-9 to 2-2 in the replay on 26 December.

Teams

Group 1 – Aherlow, Kilsheelan-Kilcash, Galtee Rovers, Fethard
Group 2 – Clonmel Commercials, Arravale Rovers, Moyne-Templetuohy, Cahir, Clonmel Og
Group 3 – Loughmore-Castleiney, Thomas MacDonaghs, Ardfinnan, JK Brackens, Ballyporeen
Group 4 – Moyle Rovers, Eire Og Annacarty, Moycarkey-Borris, Killenaule

Fixtures
Preliminary Quarter-Finals (15/16 November)
Arravale Rovers 0-13 Ardfinnan 1-6
Moyle Rovers 0-9 Galtee Rovers/St Pecaun 0-8
Kilsheelan-Kilcash 0-9 Thomas MacDonagh's 3-8
JK Brackens 0-8 Éire Óg Annacarty/Donohill 1-13

Quarter-Finals (23/30 November)
Thomas MacDonaghs 1-9 Killenaule 0-8
Arravale Rovers 0-9 Loughmore-Castleiney 0-12
Eire Og Annacarty 0-15 Cahir 3-6
Replay: Cahir 0-10 Éire Óg Annacarty 0-5
Aherlow 1-9 Moyle Rovers 0-11

Semi-Finals (14 December)
Loughmore Castleiney 3-5 Aherlow 0-8
Thomas MacDonaghs 3-5 Cahir 2-10

Final (21 December, 1:30pm, Cashel)
Loughmore Castleiney 2-7 Cahir 1-10

Final Replay (26 December, 1:00pm, Cashel)
Loughmore Castleiney 0-9 Cahir 2-2

References

External links
Tipperary GAA Official Site

Tipperary Senior Football Championship
Tipperary Senior Football Championship